Denys Samson (born 21 August 1989) is a Ukrainian ballroom and Latin dancer and choreographer.

Career 
Samson is a former two-time Ukrainian Ten Dance Champion and a two-time World Ten Dance Champion.

Dancing with the Stars

Ukraine 
In September 2021, Samson joined the cast of the ninth season of the Ukrainian version of Dancing with the Stars, Tantsi z zirkamy, as a professional dancer. He was originally partnered with comedian, Anastasia Orudzhova. However, in preparation for their first dance, Orudzhova suffered a knee injury and was forced to withdraw from the competition following her first performance. Orudzhova was replaced by her colleague and fellow-comedian, Oleksandra Mashlyatina and Samson partnered her instead. They were the second couple to be eliminated from the competition.

Ireland 
On 22 December 2021, Samson was announced as one of the new professionals to join the fifth season of the Irish version of Dancing with the Stars. He reached the final with singer and songwriter, Erica-Cody.

Samson returned for the sixth series in 2023, where he was partnered with drag queen, Panti Bliss. This makes them the first same-sex pairing in the history of the show. They were the sixth couple to be eliminated from the show, after losing their dance-off to Brooke Scullion and Robert Rowiński.

Series 5 – with celebrity partner Erica-Cody

In week 9, Samson tested positive for COVID-19, so his partner, Erica-Cody danced with Ervinas Merfeldas.

Series 6 – with celebrity partner Panti Bliss

References 

1989 births
Living people
Ballroom dancers